VisualSVN is an Apache Subversion client, implemented as a low-level VS package extension for Microsoft Visual Studio, that provides an interface to perform the most common revision control operations directly from inside the Visual Studio IDE. VisualSVN is a commercial program, with a free 30-day trial available. VisualSVN Community License allows free use of VisualSVN on a computer that is not a member of an Active Directory domain.

VisualSVN supports Visual Studio 2005, Visual Studio 2008, Visual Studio 2010, Visual Studio 2012, Visual Studio 2013, Visual Studio 2015, Visual Studio 2017 and Visual Studio 2019.

VisualSVN Server 

VisualSVN Server is a free Apache Subversion server package for Windows. The server package contains a stripped-down Apache HTTP Server, a Subversion server, and a Microsoft Management Console configuration interface, for a one-click installation of a Subversion server on Windows platform.

See also 
 Comparison of Subversion clients
 Apache Subversion - an open-source application used for revision control
 TortoiseSVN - is a Subversion client, implemented as a Microsoft Windows shell extension
 AnkhSVN - An open-source Visual Studio integration package for the Subversion version control system
 VsTortoise - A free-of-charge add-in for Microsoft Visual Studio 2005/2008/2010 that provides an interface to perform the most common revision control operations directly from inside the Visual Studio IDE.

External links 
 
 Apache Subversion
 TortoiseSVN

Apache Subversion
Windows-only freeware